William Fraser Dea (born April 3, 1933) is a Canadian former professional ice hockey centre and head coach in the National Hockey League (NHL). He played in the NHL from 1953 to 1971, and then served as a coach during the 1981–82 season.

Playing career
A minor league standout, Dea began his NHL career with a brief fourteen game assignment with the New York Rangers during the 1953–54 season. On August 18, 1955, the Rangers traded the NHL rights to Dea and Aggie Kukulowicz to the Detroit Red Wings in exchange for Bronco Horvath and Dave Creighton.

In 1957, he joined the Red Wings as a starting two-way forward. The next season, he was traded mid-season to the Chicago Black Hawks. For the next nine years, Dea would play exclusively in the American Hockey League, before expansion gave him another crack at the NHL. During the 1967–68 and 1968-69 campaigns, he was a regular on the Pittsburgh Penguins. He then returned to the Red Wings for an additional two years, ending his career with 67 goals and 54 assists in 397 games. In 1975, Dea became an assistant coach with the Red Wings.

Post-playing career
In retirement, Dea joined the Detroit front office. During the 1981–82 NHL season, he became the head coach as a mid-season replacement for Wayne Maxner. He currently serves as a scout for the Florida Panthers.

In 2017, he was inducted into the AHL Hall of Fame.

Dea earned the nickname "Hard Rock" for his punishing style of play. He is an uncle to NHL defenceman James Wisniewski.

Career statistics

Regular season and playoffs

NHL coaching record

References

External links
 

1933 births
Living people
Baltimore Clippers players
Buffalo Bisons (AHL) players
Canadian ice hockey centres
Canadian ice hockey coaches
Chicago Blackhawks players
Detroit Red Wings coaches
Detroit Red Wings players
Detroit Red Wings scouts
Edmonton Flyers (WHL) players
New York Rangers players
Pittsburgh Penguins players
Saskatoon Quakers players
Ice hockey people from Edmonton
Vancouver Canucks (WHL) players